Maben may refer to:

Maben, Mississippi
Maben, West Virginia
Maben Airport, Prattsville, New York

See also
Mabyn, a medieval Cornish saint